Cruz del Eje is a city in the province of Córdoba, Argentina. It is the head town of the department of the same name, which has a population of about 52,000.

The area of the city was originally inhabited by Comechingón aboriginals, which were thoroughly displaced or exterminated by the Spanish conquistadores by the end of the 17th century. The first official owner of the lands was Francisco de Baigorri, as recorded on September 22, 1735, which is taken as the foundation date of the city.

The settlement was linked by a road to the provincial capital, Córdoba, in 1878, and it was declared a municipality on May 8, 1890; at the time it had about 4,000 inhabitants. On the latter year the train station was also opened. Cruz del Eje's position as a railroad node would lead to a rapid growth in importance; the railway workshops were dismantled in the 1970s. The Cruz del Eje Reservoir, initiated by Governor Amadeo Sabattini, was completed in 1943. The city grew subsequently as a tourist destination.

President Arturo Illia maintained a medical practice in Cruz del Eje from 1928 until his election as President of Argentina in 1963. President Illia's Cruz del Eje home was made a museum in 2003.

References

External links
 Portal of the city

Populated places in Córdoba Province, Argentina
Populated places established in 1735
Cities in Argentina
Córdoba Province, Argentina
Argentina